Khurram Shahzad may refer to:

 Khurram Shahzad (Punjab cricketer) (born 1999), Pakistani cricketer
 Khurram Shahzad (Sindh cricketer) (born 1993), Pakistani cricketer
 Khurram Shahzad (Qatari cricketer) (born 1988), Qatari cricketer
 Khurram Shahzad (weightlifter) (born 1981), Pakistani weightlifter

See also
 Khurram Shehzad (disambiguation)